Celebrate is the second album from American singer James Durbin. The album was released on April 8, 2014. The first single from the album, "Parachute", was released on November 22, 2013.

Critical reception
Glenn Gamboa of Newsday gave the album a B grade, saying "James Durbin made a name on American Idol as a hard rocker with a big voice, but on his sophomore album [...] he tries out all sorts of musical styles. His current single, "Parachute," is a straight-up pop-rock winner, following in the footsteps of Daughtry, as he sings the catchy hook "Jump! Jump! Jump! Without my parachute" to approximate falling in love. The ballad "Issues" could have come from the latest One Direction album, a more metallic-tinged "Story of My Life." That doesn't mean Durbin has given up rocking out, though, as the rumbling "Louder Than a Loaded Gun" shows."

Track listing

Chart performance
The album debuted on the Billboard 200 at No. 83.  It also debuted in three other Billboard charts:  No. 14 on Top Rock Albums, No. 21 on Top Internet Albums, and No. 78 on Top Current Albums.  It sold 4,000 copies in its debut week.

References

2014 albums
James Durbin (singer) albums